Sebastian Nađ (born 30 May 1997) is a Serbian Greco-Roman wrestler. He won the gold medal in the 63 kg event at the 2022 World Wrestling Championships held in Belgrade, Serbia.

Career 

In 2017, he lost his bronze medal match at the U23 European Championships held in Szombathely, Hungary. A few months later, he was awarded the bronze medal after Aslan Visaitov of Russia tested positive for a banned substance.

He competed in the 67 kg event at the 2021 World Wrestling Championships held in Oslo, Norway. He lost his bronze medal match in the 67 kg event at the European Wrestling Championships in Budapest, Hungary.

He won the silver medal in the men's 67 kg at the 2021 Dan Kolov & Nikola Petrov Tournament held in Plovdiv, Bulgaria and the 2022 Dan Kolov & Nikola Petrov Tournament held in Veliko Tarnovo, Bulgaria.

Achievements

References

External links 

 

Living people
1997 births
People from Senta
Serbian male sport wrestlers
World Wrestling Championships medalists
21st-century Serbian people
World Wrestling Champions